Get Lost, Find Yourself is the third studio album by French rock band Chunk! No, Captain Chunk!, released on 18 May 2015. It is their first album without founding drummer Jonathan Donnaes, who left the band to spend time with his fiancée in August 2014.

Release and reception
The first single, "Playing Dead", was released on 24 March 2015. The second single, "The Other Line" was released on 20 April. The album was released on 18 May through Fearless Records.

Reviewing the album for Kerrang!, Tom Shepherd said the band "stack their sound in favour of their saccharine melodies" matched with a "more measured use of the chuggy breakdowns" and as a result the album benefits. The album was included at number 28 on Rock Sounds top 50 releases of 2015 list.

Track listing

Personnel
Chunk! No, Captain Chunk!
 Bert Poncet – lead vocals 
 Éric Poncet – lead guitar, backing vocals
 Paul "Wilson" Cordebard – rhythm guitar, backing vocals 
 Mathias Rigal – bass
 Bastien Lafaye – drums, percussion

Production
 Kyle Black – producer, engineer, mixing

Chart positions

References
 Citations

Sources

 
 
 

Chunk! No, Captain Chunk! albums
Fearless Records albums
2015 albums